Holly Takos (born ) is an Australian female Track Cyclist. She represents Australia at international competitions, including at the 2017 UCI Track Cycling World Championships.

Career results
2016
 1st Women's Keirin, Oceania Track Cycling Championships
 1st Women's Team Sprint, Oceania Track Cycling Championships
4th Women's Sprint, Oceania Track Cycling Championships
4th Women's Team Sprint, UCI Track Cycling World Cup 1
5th Women's Sprint, UCI Track Cycling World Cup 1
2017
 1st Women's Team Sprint, Australian National Track Cycling Championships
4th Women's Sprint, Australian National Track Cycling Championships
2018
 1st Women's Team Sprint, Australian National Track Cycling Championships

References

1995 births
Living people
Australian female cyclists
Australian track cyclists
Place of birth missing (living people)
Cyclists at the 2014 Commonwealth Games
Commonwealth Games competitors for Australia